Kiwalani is an administrative ward in the Ilala district of the Dar es Salaam Region of Tanzania. According to the 2012 census, the ward has a total population of 82,292.

References

Ilala District
Wards of Dar es Salaam Region